The Fundamentals: A Testimony To The Truth (generally referred to simply as The Fundamentals) is a set of ninety essays published between 1910 and 1915 by the Testimony Publishing Company of Chicago. It was initially published quarterly in twelve volumes, then republished in 1917 by the Bible Institute of Los Angeles as a four-volume set. Baker Books reprinted all four volumes under two covers in 2003.

According to its foreword, the publication was designed to be "a new statement of the fundamentals of Christianity." However, its contents reflect a concern with certain theological innovations related to liberal Christianity, especially biblical higher criticism. It is widely considered to be the foundation of modern Christian fundamentalism.

The project was conceived in 1909 by California businessman Lyman Stewart, the founder of Union Oil and a devout Presbyterian and dispensationalist. He and his brother Milton anonymously provided funds for composing, printing, and distributing the publication. The project had three successive editors: A. C. Dixon, Louis Meyer, and Reuben Archer Torrey. The essays were written by sixty-four different authors, representing most of the major Protestant Christian denominations. It was mailed free of charge to ministers, missionaries, professors of theology, YMCA and YWCA secretaries, Sunday school superintendents, and other Protestant religious workers in the United States and other English-speaking countries. Over three million volumes (250,000 sets) were sent out.

The volumes defended orthodox Protestant beliefs and attacked higher criticism, liberal theology, Romanism, socialism, modernism, atheism, Christian Science, Mormonism, Millennial Dawn (whose members were sometimes known as Russellites, but which later split into another group, adopting the name Jehovah's Witnesses), spiritualism, and what it called evolutionism.

The Fundamentals essays
arrangement of the original 12-volume set:

 Volume I:
 The Virgin Birth of Christ - James Orr
 The Deity of Christ - Benjamin B. Warfield
 The Purposes of the Incarnation - G. Campbell Morgan
 The Personality and Deity of the Holy Spirit - R. A. Torrey
 The Proof of the Living God - Arthur T. Pierson
 History of the Higher Criticism - Dyson Hague
 A Personal Testimony - Howard A. Kelly
 Volume II:
 The Testimony of the Monuments to the Truth of the Scriptures - George Frederick Wright
 The Recent Testimony of Archaeology to the Scriptures - Melvin Grove Kyle
 Fallacies of the Higher Criticism - Franklin Johnson
 Christ and Criticism - Robert Anderson
 Modern Philosophy - Philip Mauro
 Justification by Faith - Handley Carr Glyn Moule
 Tributes to Christ and the Bible by Brainy Men not Known as Active Christians
 Volume III:
 Inspiration of the Bible—Definition, Extent, and Proof - James M. Gray
 The Moral Glory of Jesus Christ a Proof of Inspiration - William G. Moorehead
 God in Christ the Only Revelation of the Fatherhood of God - Robert E. Speer
 The Testimony of Christian Experience - E. Y. Mullins
 Christianity No Fable - Thomas Whitelaw
 My Personal Experience with the Higher Criticism - James J. Reeve
 The Personal Testimony of Charles T. Studd
 Volume IV:
 The Tabernacle in the Wilderness: Did it Exist? - David Heagle
 The Testimony of Christ to the Old Testament - William Caven
 The Bible and Modern Criticism - F. Bettex
 Science and Christian Faith - James Orr
 A Personal Testimony - Philip Mauro
 Volume V:
 Life in the Word - Philip Mauro
 The Scriptures - A. C. Dixon
 The Certainty and Importance of the Bodily Resurrection of Jesus Christ from the Dead - R. A. Torrey
 Observations of the Conversion and Apostleship of St. Paul - Lord Lyttleton (analyzed and condensed by J. L. Campbell)
 A Personal Testimony - H. W. Webb-Peploe
 Volume VI:
 The Testimony of Foreign Missions to the Superintending Providence of God - Arthur T. Pierson
 Is There a God? - Thomas Whitelaw
 Sin and Judgment to Come - Robert Anderson
 The Atonement - Franklin Johnson
 The God-Man - John Stock
 The Early Narratives of Genesis - James Orr
 The Person and Work of Jesus Christ - John L. Nuelsen
 The Hope of the Church - John McNicol
 Volume VII:
 The Passing of Evolution - George Frederick Wright
 Inspiration - L. W. Munhall
 The Testimony of the Scriptures to Themselves - George S. Bishop
 Testimony of the Organic Unity of the Bible to its Inspiration - Arthur T. Pierson
 One Isaiah - George L. Robinson
 The Book of Daniel - Joseph D. Wilson
 Three Peculiarities of the Pentateuch - Andrew Craig Robinson
 Millennial Dawn: A Counterfeit of Christianity - William G. Moorehead
 Volume VIII:
 Old Testament Criticism and New Testament Christianity - W. H. Griffith Thomas
 Evolutionism in the Pulpit - Anonymous
 Decadence of Darwinism - Henry H. Beach
 Paul's Testimony to the Doctrine of Sin - Charles B. Williams
 The Science of Conversion - H. M. Sydenstricker
 The Doctrinal Value of the First Chapters of Genesis - Dyson Hague
 The Knowledge of God - James Burrell
 "Preach the Word" - Howard Crosby
 Mormonism: Its Origin, Characteristics, and Doctrines - R. G. McNiece
 Volume IX:
 The True Church - Bishop Ryle
 The Mosaic Authorship of the Pentateuch - George Frederick Wright
 The Wisdom of this World - A. W. Pitzer
 Holy Scripture and Modern Negations - James Orr
 Salvation by Grace - Thomas Spurgeon
 Divine Efficacy of Prayer - Arthur T. Pierson
 What Christ Teaches Concerning Future Retribution - William C. Procter
 A Message from Missions - Charles A. Bowen
 Eddyism: Commonly Called Christian Science - Maurice E. Wilson
 Volume X:
 Why Save the Lord's Day? - Daniel Hoffman Martin
 The Internal Evidence of the Fourth Gospel - Canon G. Osborne Troop
 The Nature of Regeneration - Thomas Boston
 Regeneration—Conversion—Reformation - George W. Lasher
 Our Lord's Teachings About Money - Arthur T. Pierson
 Satan and His Kingdom - Mrs. Jessie Penn-Lewis
 The Holy Spirit and the Sons of God - W. J. Erdman
 Consecration - Henry W. Frost
 The Apologetic Value of Paul's Epistles - E.J. Stobo
 What the Bible Contains for the Believer - George F. Pentecost
 Modern Spiritualism Briefly Tested by Scripture - Algernon J. Pollock
 Volume XI:
 The Biblical Conception of Sin - Thomas Whitelaw
 At-One-Ment by Propitiation - Dyson Hague
 The Grace of God - C. I. Scofield
 Fulfilled Prophecy A Potent Argument for the Bible - Arno C. Gaebelein
 The Coming of Christ - Charles R. Erdman
 Is Romanism Christianity? - T. W. Medhurst
 Rome, The Antagonist of the Nation - J. M. Foster
 Volume XII:
 Doctrines that Must be Emphasized in Successful Evangelism - L. W. Munhall
 Pastoral and Personal Evangelism, or Winning Men to Christ One-by-One - John Timothy Stone
 The Sunday School's True Evangelism - Charles Gallaudet Trumbull
 Foreign Missions or World-Wide Evangelism - Robert E. Speer
 What Missionary Motives Should Prevail? - Henry W. Frost
 The Place of Prayer in Evangelism - R. A. Torrey
 The Church and Socialism - Charles R. Erdman
 The Fifteen Books Most Indispensable for the Minister or the Christian Worker

References

Online texts
 The Fundamentals, in the 12-volume scheme:
 Volumes I-VII: multiple formats at archive.org
 Volume IV-IX: page images at HathiTrust
 Volume X: multiple formats at archive.org
 Volume XI: multiple formats at archive.org
 Volume XII: page images at HathiTrust
Torrey's 4 volume set (downloadable PDFs) at Northwestern Theological Seminary. Volume 1, Volume 2, Volume 3, Volume 4

Further reading

External links
The Fundamentals on Theopedia

1910 non-fiction books
1910 anthologies
Christian fundamentalism
Essay anthologies